Hashish (also Romanized as Ḩashīsh) is a village in Jorjafak Rural District, in the Central District of Zarand County, Kerman Province, Iran. At the 2006 census, its population was 47, in 16 families.

References 

Populated places in Zarand County